Syntherata is a genus of moths in the family Saturniidae first described by Peter Maassen in 1873.

Species
Syntherata apicalis Bouvier, 1928
Syntherata arfakiana Brechlin, 2010
Syntherata brunnea Eckerlein, 1935
Syntherata cernyi Brechlin, 2010
Syntherata doboensis U. & L. Paukstadt, 2004
Syntherata engaiana Brechlin, 2010
Syntherata escarlata Lane, Edwards & Naumann, 2010
Syntherata godeffroyi Butler, 1882
Syntherata innescens Naumann & Brechlin, 2001
Syntherata janetta (White, 1843)
Syntherata lagariana Brechlin, 2010
Syntherata leonae Lane, 2003
Syntherata malukuensis U. Paukstadt & L. Paukstadt, 2005
Syntherata minoris Brechlin, 2010
Syntherata naessigi Peigler, 1992
Syntherata okapiana Brechlin, 2010
Syntherata papuensis Brechlin, 2010
Syntherata parvoantennata Brechlin, 2010
Syntherata pristina (Walker, 1865)
Syntherata rudloffi Brechlin, 2010
Syntherata sinjaevi Naumann & Brechlin, 2001

References

Saturniinae